"The Night of the Meek" is episode 47 of the American television anthology series The Twilight Zone. It originally aired on December 23, 1960, on CBS. It was one of the six episodes of the second season which was shot on videotape in a short-lived experiment aimed to cut costs.

Introductory scene/opening narration
As snow begins to fall, a drunk Henry Corwin, wearing his Santa Claus suit, stumbles and half-falls at a curbside lamppost. He is approached by two tenement children pleading for toys, a Christmas dinner, and "a job for my daddy." As Corwin begins to sob, the camera turns to Rod Serling standing on the sidewalk:

Plot
On Christmas Eve, Corwin arrives for his seasonal job as a department-store Santa an hour late and obviously drunk. When customers complain, Dundee, the manager, fires him and orders him off the premises. Corwin says that he drinks because he lives in a rooming house with the poor, for whom he is incapable of fulfilling his role as Santa. He declares that if he had just one wish granted him on Christmas Eve, he'd "like to see the meek inherit the earth."

Still in his outfit, he returns to the bar but is refused re-entry by Bruce. Stumbling into an alley, he hears sleigh bells. A cat knocks down a large burlap bag full of empty cans, but when Corwin trips over it, it is now filled with gift-wrapped packages. Overjoyed at his sudden ability to fulfill dreams, Corwin proceeds to hand out presents to passing children and then to derelict men attending Christmas Eve service at a mission house. Irritated by the disruption, the proprietress goes outside to fetch Officer Flaherty.

Flaherty takes Corwin to the police station on suspicion of theft. Dundee meets them at the station, where he and Flaherty find empty cans in Corwin's sack. Angry at having his time wasted, Dundee accuses Flaherty of incompetence; when Dundee challenges Corwin to produce a bottle of cherry brandy, vintage 1903, Corwin does just that, and is set free. He continues to distribute gifts until midnight, when the bag is empty.

A man named Burt, whose desired pipe and smoking jacket comes from Corwin's bag, points out that Corwin himself has not received a gift. Corwin says that if he had his choice of any gift at all, "I think I'd wish I could do this every year." Returning to the alley where the gift-laden bag had presented itself, he encounters an elf sitting in a large reindeer-hauled sleigh, waiting for him. Realizing that his wish has come true and he is now the real Santa Claus, Corwin sits in the sleigh and sets off with the elf.

Emerging drunkenly from the precinct, Flaherty and Dundee look upward upon hearing bells and see Corwin ascending into the night sky. Dundee invites Flaherty to accompany him home and share some hot coffee, with brandy poured in it, adding, "...and we'll thank God for miracles, Flaherty..." The episode ends with a shot of the bag sitting next to the trash can Corwin originally found it in.

Closing narration

The original narration, on December 23, 1960, ended with the words, "and a Merry Christmas, to each and all", but that phrase was deleted in the 1980s and is now excluded from reruns, VHS releases and the five-DVD set The Twilight Zone: The Definitive Edition. The phrase is heard in the Blu-ray release of Season 2 as well as the version streamed by Netflix, but with noticeably different sound quality from the rest of Serling's narration. As broadcast on the MeTV Network on Christmas Day 2019 and thereafter, the last line has been restored in syndication.

Credits
Directed by Jack Smight
Written by Rod Serling
Produced by Buck Houghton
Art Carney as Henry Corwin
John Fiedler as Mr. Dundee
Robert P. Lieb as Flaherty
Val Avery as the Bartender
Meg Wyllie as Sister Florence
Kay Cousins Johnson as Irate Mother
Burt Mustin as Old Man (Burt)
Trains by Lionel Corp.
Reindeer furnished by Santa's Village – Skyforest, California

Production
"The Night of the Meek" was one of six Twilight Zone episodes shot on videotape instead of film in an attempt to cut costs. By November 1960 The Twilight Zone'''s season two had already broadcast five episodes and finished filming sixteen. However, at a cost of about $65,000 per episode, the show was exceeding its budget. As a result, six consecutive episodes (production code #173-3662 through #173-3667) were videotaped at CBS Television City and eventually transferred to 16-millimeter film ["kinescoped"] for syndicated rebroadcasts. Total savings on editing and cinematography amounted to only about $30,000 for all six entries, not enough to justify the loss of depth of visual perspective, which made the shows look like stage-bound live TV dramas (such as Playhouse 90, which was also produced at CBS), or even daytime soap operas, which, at the time, were quickly and cheaply produced live on one or two sets. The experiment was deemed a failure and never attempted again.

Personnel with multiple Twilight Zone credits
 Jack Smight directed three other Twilight Zone episodes: "The Lonely", "The Lateness of the Hour", and "Twenty Two"
 John Fiedler played a bureaucratic angel in the third season's penultimate episode, "Cavender Is Coming", a failed sitcom pilot replete with a laugh track
 Burt Mustin plays one of the residents of the old-age home in third season's "Kick the Can"
 Andrea Margolis' second appearance came the following week, "Dust", in which she portrays Estrelita, a little Mexican girl
 Nan Peterson's three other appearances are in "Walking Distance", "The Whole Truth",  and "From Agnes—With Love", in which, as here, she is unbilled

Remake
 This episode was remade into an episode of the 1980s version of The Twilight Zone called "Night of the Meek", which starred Richard Mulligan as Henry Corwin and William Atherton as Mr. Dundee
 There was a radio adaptation of The Twilight Zone episode "The Night of the Meek" which starred Christopher McDonald

See also
 List of The Twilight Zone (1959 TV series) episodes

References

Sources
DeVoe, Bill. (2008). Trivia from The Twilight Zone. Albany, GA: Bear Manor Media. 
Grams, Martin. (2008). The Twilight Zone: Unlocking the Door to a Television Classic''. Churchville, MD: OTR Publishing.

External links
 
The Night of the Meek at the TV.com episode page

1960 American television episodes
The Twilight Zone (1959 TV series season 2) episodes
American Christmas television episodes
Santa Claus in television
Television episodes written by Rod Serling